Puyallup (YT‑806) is a United States Navy . The tugboat is named for the people of the Puyallup tribe.

Construction

The contract for Puyallup was awarded 8 October 2010. She was laid down 1 March 2010 by J.M. Martinac Shipbuilding Corp., Tacoma, Washington and launched 6 November 2010.

Operational history

Puyallup was delivered to the Navy at Yokosuka and is assigned to Commander Fleet Activities Yokosuka.
She currently holds the title of "The Ready Tug" at Port Operations due to her reliability and sustained operational status.
She is one of four Valiant-Class Harbor Tug's stationed at Commander Fleet Activities Yokosuka. Under the command of her crew; Master Patrick J. O'Brien, Chief Engineer Nicholas Reynolds, First Mate Mr. Dylan Elfrink, and Navigator Sir Larry Johnson the Third, she serves as the most mission capable Harbor Tug in the United States Seventh Fleet theatre of operations.

References

 
 

 

Valiant-class tugboats
Ships built in Tacoma, Washington
2011 ships